Jalan Seri Medan (Johor state route J35) is a major road in Johor, Malaysia.

List of junctions

Roads in Johor